In Hebrew orthography, niqqud or nikud ( or ) is a system of diacritical signs used to represent vowels or distinguish between alternative pronunciations of letters of the Hebrew alphabet.  Several such diacritical systems were developed in the Early Middle Ages. The most widespread system, and the only one still used to a significant degree today, was created by the Masoretes of Tiberias in the second half of the first millennium AD in the Land of Israel (see Masoretic Text, Tiberian Hebrew). Text written with niqqud is called ktiv menuqad.

Niqqud marks are small compared to the letters, so they can be added without retranscribing texts whose writers did not anticipate them.

In modern Israeli orthography niqqud is seldom used, except in specialised texts such as dictionaries, poetry, or texts for children or for new immigrants to Israel. For purposes of disambiguation, a system of spelling without niqqud, known in Hebrew as ktiv maleh (literally "full spelling") has developed. This was formally standardised in the Rules for Spelling without Niqqud enacted by the Academy of the Hebrew Language in 1996, and updated in 2017.

One reason for the lesser use of niqqud is that it no longer reflects the current pronunciation. In modern Hebrew, tzere is pronounced the same as segol, although they were distinct in Tiberian Hebrew, and pataḥ the same as qamatz. To the younger generation of native Hebrew speakers, these distinctions seem arbitrary and meaningless; on the other hand, Hebrew language purists have rejected out of hand the idea of changing the basics of niqqud and fitting them to the current pronunciation – with the result that in practice niqqud is increasingly going out of use.

According to Ghil'ad Zuckermann, the lack of nikúd in what he calls "Israeli" (Modern Hebrew) often results in "mispronunciations". For example, the Israeli lexical item מתאבנים is often pronounced as mitabním (literally "becoming fossilized (masculine plural)") instead of metaavním "appetizers", the latter deriving from תאבון teavón "appetite", whereas the former deriving from אבן éven "stone". Another example is the toponym מעלה אדומים, which is often pronounced as maalé edomím instead of maalé adumím, the latter appearing in the Hebrew Bible (Joshua 15:7 and 18:17). The hypercorrect yotvetá is used instead of yotváta for the toponym יטבתה, mentioned in Deuteronomy 10:7. The surname of American actress Farrah Fawcett (פארהפוסט) is often pronounced fost instead of fóset by many Israelis.

Demonstration
Any other letters shown are actually part of the vowel. Note that there is some variation among different traditions in exactly how some vowel points are pronounced. The table below shows how most Israelis would pronounce them, but the classic Ashkenazi pronunciation, for example, differs in several respects.

Note concerning IPA: the transcription symbols are linked to the articles about the sounds they represent. The diacritic ˘ (breve) indicates a short vowel; the triangular colon symbol ː indicates that the vowel is long.

Keyboard
Both consonants and niqqud can be typed from virtual graphical keyboards available on the World Wide Web, or by methods integrated into particular operating systems.

Microsoft Windows
 In Windows 8 or later, niqqud can be entered using the right alt (or left alt + ctrl) + the first Hebrew letter of the name of the value, when using the default (Hebrew Standard) keyboard layout:

In Windows 7 or earlier, niqqud can be entered by enabling Caps Lock and then, with the cursor positioned after a letter, pressing Shift and one of the keys in the Windows column below.
 The user can configure the registry to allow use of the Alt key with the numeric plus key to type the hexadecimal Unicode value.
 The user can use the Microsoft Keyboard Layout Creator to produce a custom keyboard layout, or can download a layout produced by another party.

Linux
In GTK+ Linux systems, niqqud can be entered by holding down AltGR and pressing the same keys as for Windows, above, or by pressing ctrl+shift+u followed by the appropriate 4 digit Unicode.

Macintosh
Using the Hebrew keyboard layout in Mac OS X, the typist can enter niqqud by pressing the Option key together with a number on the top row of the keyboard. Other combinations such as sofit and hataf can also be entered by pressing either the Shift key and a number, or by pressing the Shift key, Option key, and a number at the same time.

Notes:
 1 The letter "" represents any Hebrew consonant.
 2 For sin-dot and shin-dot, the letter "" (sin/shin) is used.
 3 The dagesh, mappiq, and shuruk have different uses, but the same graphical representation, and hence are input in the same manner.
 4 For shuruk, the letter "" (vav) is used since it can only be used with that letter.
 A rafe can be input by inserting the corresponding Unicode character, either explicitly or via a customized keyboard layout.

SIL International have developed another standard, which is based on Tiro, but adds the Niqqud along the home keys. Linux comes with "Israel — Biblical Hebrew (Tiro)" as a standard layout.  With this layout, niqqud can be typed without pressing the Caps Lock key.

See also
 The Arabic equivalent, harakat.
 Hebrew diacritics
 Q're perpetuum
 Hebrew spelling
 Tiberian Hebrew
 Hebrew keyboard

Notes

Bibliography
 

References

External links
Diacritical Vowel Markers